The 2009–10 Cincinnati Bearcats women's basketball team will represent the University of Cincinnati in the 2009–10 NCAA Division I women's basketball season. The Bearcats will be coached by Jamelle Elliott, and play their home games at Fifth Third Arena in Cincinnati, Ohio. The Bearcats are a member of the Big East conference and will attempt to win the NCAA championship.

Offseason
May 5:Jamelle Elliott, a former student-athlete and assistant coach at the University of Connecticut, has been named the University of Cincinnati's eighth head basketball coach. Elliott has spent part of the last two decades with the Connecticut women's basketball program. She spent the last 12 years as an assistant coach. She has been a part of six national championships, including the Huskies' 2009 undefeated championship run, and won a title as a player, helping UConn to the 1995 championship, the first in the school's history.
April 28: The Bearcats signed Shareese Ulis, a junior college transfer to a National Letter of Intent. Ulis will join the team for the 2009-10 academic year and have two years of eligibility remaining at UC. Ulis is a 5-7 guard from Trinity Valley CC (TX), where she averaged 12.0 points, 3.0 assists, 3.0 rebounds, and 3.0 steals per game. She also was an all-conference and honorable mention all-region selection during her time at TVCC.

Exhibition

Regular season
The Bearcats will compete in the Great Alaska Shootout from November 24 to 25.

Roster

Schedule

Player stats

Postseason

NCAA basketball tournament

Awards and honors

Team players drafted into the WNBA

See also
2009-10 Cincinnati Bearcats men's basketball team

References

External links
Official Site

Cincinnati Bearcats women's basketball seasons
Cincinnati